Zhire is a poorly known Plateau language of Nigeria. A variety called Shang is relexified Zhire.

References

Further reading
A Sociolinguistic Profile of the Zhire (zhi) Language of Kaduna State, Nigeria

External links
Shang wordlist

Central Plateau languages
Languages of Nigeria